Pierre Brûlart, Marquis de Sillery, Viscount Puisieux, Baron Grand Pressigny (1583 – 22 April 1640) served Louis XIII as joint Minister of Foreign Affairs and War from 1617 to 1626.

Life

Pierre Brûlart was born in 1583, son of Nicolas Brûlart, marquis de Sillery, 1544–1624 and Claude Prudhomme. His father was combined Secretary of State for War & Foreign Affairs from 1606 to 1616 and Chancellor of France 1607 to 1624.
 
In 1613, his first wife, Magdalena de Neufville, died childless; his second marriage was to Charlotte d'Estampes (ca. 1597–1677) in 1615. They had seven children who survived to adulthood; Charlotte 1619–1697, Roger Louis 1619–1691, Nicolas (died after 1677), Claude, Marie Eléonor (died 1687), Françoise and Eléonor Adam (died 1699).

As was then common, only Charlotte and Roger Louis married and the other five entered religious orders. Marie Eléonor became Abbess of the Benedictine convent founded at Avenay by Bertha of Val d'Or at the end of the sixth century CE. One of the most prestigious religious institutions in Champagne, this was testimony to the family's status; it was so popular, limits were placed on the numbers accepted.

He died in April 1640 and was buried in the Chapelle du Sacré-Cœur, built in Marines by his father.

Career

References

Sources
 
 

1583 births
1640 deaths
Sillery, Pierre Brulart Marquis de
Sillery, Pierre Brulart Marquis de
Sillery, Pierre Brulart Marquis de
17th-century French diplomats